Halo is a military science fiction media franchise, originally developed by Bungie and currently managed and developed by 343 Industries, part of Microsoft's Xbox Game Studios. The series launched in 2001 with the first-person shooter video game Halo: Combat Evolved and its tie-in novel, The Fall of Reach. The latest main game, Halo Infinite, was released in 2021.

Combat Evolved started life as a real-time strategy game, then became a third-person shooter, and finally a first-person shooter releasing as an exclusive on Microsoft's new Xbox video game console after Bungie was acquired by the company. Bungie regained its independence in 2007, releasing additional Halo games through 2010. Microsoft established 343 Industries to direct the franchise going forward, and has produced games itself and in partnership with other studios. 

Combat Evolved was a critical and commercial success, serving as the Xbox's "killer app" and cementing Microsoft as a major player in the video game console space. Its sequels expanded the franchise's commercial and critical success, and have sold more than 81 million copies worldwide. With more than $6 billion in franchise grosses, Halo is one of the highest-grossing media franchises of all time, spanning novels, graphic novels, comic books, short films, animated films, feature films, and other licensed products.

Plot

Hundreds of thousands of years ago, the Mantle of Responsibility belonged to the Precursors, who gave all life to the galaxy. However, the Precursors wanted to give such power, instead of to the Forerunners as originally planned, to the human race. In retaliation, the Forerunners drove the Precursors into extinction. Instead of fighting back, the Precursors let themselves die to their creations, turning into a dust to later become themselves once again. It spread like wildfire due to ancient humans rubbing the powders on their pets, believing it helped their pets to live longer. However, instead of helping their pets, it eventually infected and contorted them into a new parasitic species, connected by a hivemind to the minds of the last Precursors: The Flood. The Forerunners sent the humans to Earth, reverting then to a primitive civilisation based in Africa, and fought the Flood, which spread through an infestation of sentient life and had overrun much of the Milky Way Galaxy. Exhausting all other strategies, the Forerunners conceived the Halo Array — ring-shaped megastructures and weapons of last resort that would destroy all sentient life in the galaxy to stop the Flood. A civil war between the Forerunner's dictator known as the Didact, who wanted to assimilate all the humans on Earth into his army as AI's, thus immune to the flood, and his wife the Librarian, who created the Ark, an instrument which allowed for the mass creation of Halo installations which could all be activated simultaneously. The Librarian, along with all the remaining forerunners, trapped her husband inside a Forerunner repository of knowledge known as the Domain, activated the Ark and disappeared. 

Nearly a hundred thousand years later in the 26th century, humanity—under the auspices of the United Nations Space Command, or UNSC—colonized many worlds thanks to the development of faster-than-light "slipstream space" (i.e. hyperspace) travel. Tensions between the government and colonies desiring independence sparked violent clashes. The UNSC sponsored the SPARTAN-II Project to create an elite group of enhanced supersoldiers to suppress the rebellions covertly. In the year 2525, human worlds come under attack by an theocratic alliance of alien races known as the Covenant, whose leadership declared humanity heretics and an affront to their gods—the Forerunners. The Covenant began a genocidal holy war. Their superior technology and numbers proved decisive advantages; though effective, the Spartans were too few in number to turn the tide of battle in humanity's favor. After the Covenant invaded Reach, the UNSC's last major stronghold besides Earth, Master Chief John-117 was left as one of the few remaining Spartans.

The rediscovery of the Halo rings set the humans against the Covenant, who believed they were instruments of transcendence, not destruction. Master Chief and his artificial intelligence Cortana were instrumental in the destruction of a Halo ring to stop the Covenant and the threat of the Flood. Master Chief defeats the Prophet of Regret leading to the Prophets of Truth and Mercy denouncing the Sangheili as the most honourable species amongst the Covenant. This begins a civil war within the covenant, with many grappling over the revelation that their religion was false. The disgraced former Covenant Sangheili commander known as the Arbiter, along with the rest of his race, helped the humans destroy the Covenant and stop the Prophet of Truth from activating the Halo Array via the Ark. The Human-Covenant War ended, though new conflicts begin to emerge throughout the universe.

In the post-war era, the UNSC creates a new generation of Spartans, and tensions between the UNSC and colonist rebels resumed. The Master Chief and Cortana accidentally free the Didact and he briefly returns to assert supremacy over humanity, though he is foiled by the pair, resulting in Master Chief initially believing Cortana dead in the attempt. Cortana's survival through the Domain leads her to break with the UNSC and assert a new hegemony over the galaxy, with artificial intelligence (the "Created") in control. After two years of a scattered war between Cortana and the UNSC, Cortana attacks the Banished, a mercenary organization largely led by the Jiralhanae race. The Banished win the resultant conflict, terminating Cortana and battle the UNSC for control of Zeta Halo.

Game series

Bungie era
Video game developer Bungie was founded in 1991 by Alex Seropian in Chicago, Illinois, who partnered with programmer Jason Jones to market and release Jones' game Minotaur: The Labyrinths of Crete. Focusing on the Macintosh game market because it was smaller and easier to compete, Bungie became a preeminent game developer on the small Apple Macintosh platform. What became Halo: Combat Evolved started as a real-time strategy game for the Mac, originally code-named Monkey Nuts and Blam!, and took place on a hollowed-out world called Solipsis. The planet eventually became a ringworld called "Halo", which became the game's title.

Halo was announced on July 21, 1999, during the Macworld Conference & Expo. The game morphed from a real-time strategy game into a third-person action game. On June 19, 2000, Microsoft acquired Bungie and Halo: Combat Evolved became a launch title for the Xbox video game console. The game turned into a first-person shooter, and was modified to work with a controller. Though the first Halo was meant to include an online multiplayer mode, it was excluded because the Xbox Live service was not yet available.

Halo was not intended to be the Xbox's flagship game due to internal concerns and gaming press criticism, but Microsoft VP of game publishing Ed Fries did not act on these concerns. The Xbox's marketing heavily featured Halo, whose green color palette meshed with the console's design scheme. Halo: Combat Evolved introduced many gameplay and plot themes common to the whole trilogy. Players battle various aliens on foot and in vehicles to complete objectives, while attempting to uncover the secrets of the eponymous Halo. Halo limited the number of weapons players could carry to two, forcing them to carefully select their preferred armament. Players fight with ranged and melee attacks, as well as grenades. Bungie referred to the "weapons-grenades-melee" format as the "Golden Triangle of Halo". The player's health is measured in both hit points and a perpetually recharging energy shield. Released for the Xbox in November 2001, Windows and Mac OS X ports were later developed by Gearbox Software, and released in 2003. A stand-alone expansion, entitled Halo: Custom Edition, was released as a Windows exclusive, and allowed players to create custom content for the game.

The success of the game led to a sequel, Halo 2, which was announced on August 8, 2002, at Microsoft's X02 press event. It featured improved graphics, new weapons and enemies, and a multiplayer mode on Xbox Live. Halo 2 was released on the Xbox on November 9, 2004, and later for Windows Vista on May 17, 2007. The game was released in two different editions: a standard edition with just the game disc and traditional Xbox packaging; and the Collector's Edition with a specially designed aluminum case, along with an additional bonus DVD, extra booklet, and slightly different user manual. Halo 2 introduced new gameplay elements, chief among them the ability to hold and fire two weapons simultaneously, known as "dual-wielding". Unlike its predecessor, Halo 2 fully supported online multiplayer via Xbox LIVE. The game uses "matchmaking" to facilitate joining online matches by grouping players looking for certain types of games. This was a change from the more traditional "server list" approach, which was used to find matches in online games at this time.

Halo 3 was announced at the 2006 Electronic Entertainment Expo. It utilized a proprietary, in-house graphics engine, and employed advanced graphics technologies. Halo 3 is the final game in the original Halo trilogy, ending the story arc begun in Halo: Combat Evolved. The game was released on the Xbox 360 on September 25, 2007. It adds to the series vehicles, weapons, and a class of items called equipment. The game also includes a limited map-editing tool, known as the Forge, which allows players to insert game objects, such as weapons and vehicles, into existing multiplayer map geometry. Players can save a recording of their gameplay sessions, and view them as video, from any angle.

Following Halo 3s release, Bungie became an independent company once more. They created two more Halo games as part of their deal with Microsoft: a side story Halo 3: ODST (2009), and a prequel Halo: Reach (2010). Reach was Bungie's final work on a Halo release.

343 Industries era

While Bungie remained involved in the Halo series by developing games such as ODST and Reach, the rights to Halo remained with Microsoft. To oversee everything Halo, Microsoft created an internal division, called 343 Industries, to oversee the franchise.

343 had already co-developed the Halo Legends animated series and had overseen production of Halo: Reach and 2011's Halo: Combat Evolved Anniversary. The next game in the series, Halo 4, was announced at E3 2011 as the first entry in what would be originally known as the "Reclaimer Trilogy". The game included many staples of previous games, such as new or redesigned weapon types, an improved map-editing tool and expanded multiplayer options and maps. Halo 4 was released worldwide on November 6, 2012, achieving record sales for the franchise. In a new addition to the series, a story-driven multiplayer campaign entitled Spartan Ops was released over the weeks following Halo 4s release, telling what happened after the end of the main game.
In announcing the formation of 343 Industries, Microsoft also announced that Xbox Live would be home to a central hub for Halo content called Halo Waypoint. Waypoint is accessed from the Xbox 360 Dashboard and offers players access to multimedia content in addition to tracking their Halo game "career". O'Connor described Waypoint as intended to be the prime destination for Halo.

In December 2014, 343 Industries general manager Bonnie Ross expressed Microsoft's aim for the Halo series to last at least 30 more years.

Halo 5: Guardians, was released for the Xbox One on October 27, 2015. The game takes place across many worlds, mainly the Elite homeworld, and revolves around Spartan Locke's hunt for the rogue Master Chief, who is trying to find Cortana.

The third part of the Reclaimer Saga, Halo Infinite, was announced during E3 2018. It brings the focus back to Master Chief, and Halo's roots by taking place on the new Zeta Halo. The story mainly focuses on exploring the deeper lore of the Halo series, the aftermath of the war with Cortana, and battles with the Banished. It released December 2021.

Spin-offs

The success of the main Halo trilogy spurred the creation of spin-off games. Halo Wars is a real-time strategy game developed by Ensemble Studios for the Xbox 360. Set in the year 2531, the game takes place 21 years prior to the events of Halo: Combat Evolved. Much effort was spent on developing a control scheme that was simple and intuitive, unlike other console strategy games. The game was announced at X06, and released in February and March 2009.

In October 2017, 343 Industries developed and released a virtual reality demo title in partnership with Endeavor One called Halo Recruit.
In 2018, 343 Industries partnered with Raw Thrills and PlayMechanix to develop a coin-operated arcade game called  that was released in the later part of 2018, with Round1 USA and Dave & Buster's arcades releasing first.

Alternative reality games

Alternative reality games have been used to promote the release of Halo games, beginning with the Cortana Letters, a series of cryptic email messages, circulated by Bungie prior to Halo: Combat Evolveds release. I Love Bees was used to promote the release of Halo 2. The game revolved around a website created by 42 Entertainment, commissioned by Microsoft and endorsed by Bungie. Over the course of the game, audio clips were released that eventually formed a complete five-hour story set on Earth between Halo and Halo 2. Similarly, Iris was used as a viral marketing campaign for the release of Halo 3. It featured five web servers containing various media files related to the Halo universe.

Cancelled projects
Several spin-off titles were planned or rumored for the Game Boy Advance, Gizmondo, Ultra-Mobile PC, and Nintendo DS. Microsoft announced an episodic video game to be developed by film director Peter Jackson's Wingnut Interactive in 2006. The game, Halo: Chronicles, was ultimately cancelled as part of budget cuts tied to job layoffs in January 2009. Ensemble Studios developed a Halo-themed massively multiplayer online game, often referred to as Titan Project, or just Titan. The project was cancelled internally in 2007–2008, without a formal announcement from Microsoft.

343 Industries announced a free-to-play Halo multiplayer game for Windows PC, Halo Online, in 2015. The game launched with a closed beta test limited to Russia that year. The title was developed with Saber Interactive using modified version of the Halo 3 engine, and published by Innova Systems. The project was cancelled in August 2016. Players modified the game to circumvent the region limitations and add new content after the project's official cancellation. The "ElDewrito" project saw legal takedowns from Microsoft for violating its game usage rules. Despite this, ElDewrito's playerbase remained active, and the modders claimed its popularity hastened Microsoft's plans to release a Windows version of Halo: The Master Chief Collection.

Other appearances
Halo characters have appeared in tie-ins, such as the characters Spartan Nicole-458 and the Arbiter being playable fighters in Dead or Alive 4 and Killer Instinct: Season Three, respectively. Master Chief was added as a playable character in Fortnite alongside a stage inspired by a Halo multiplayer map in 2020.

Another game, Halo 2600, has the players control Master Chief and fight through four regions filled with enemies. It was written by Ed Fries, former vice president of game publishing at Microsoft, in 2010 for the Atari 2600.

The Halo theme tune was also available as downloadable content for Guitar Hero III: Legends of Rock. In Forza Horizon 4 one level has the player racing across the map in the Warthog as the Master Chief, with the Halo ring visible in the sky, Cortana on the radio and various Covenant based obstacles to avoid.

Cultural influences and themes
In 2006, in acknowledgment of the "wealth of influences adopted by the Bungie team", a list of Bungie employees' favorite science fiction material was published on the company's website. The developers acknowledged that the Halo series' use of ring-shaped megastructures followed on from concepts featured in Larry Niven's Ringworld and Iain M. Banks' Culture series (of which Consider Phlebas and Excession were said to be particularly influential). In a retrospective article in Edge, Bungie's Jaime Griesemer commented, "The influence of something like Ringworld isn't necessarily in the design – it's in that feeling of being somewhere else. That sense of scale and an epic story going on out there." Griesemer also explained, "One of the main sources of inspiration was Armor [by John Steakley], in which a soldier has to constantly re-live the same war over and over again. That sense of hopelessness, a relentless battle, was influential." The Flood were influenced by the assimilating alien species in Christopher Rowley's The Vang; it has also been speculated that the Master Chief's name "John 117" may have been a reference to a character named Jon 6725416 in Rowley's Starhammer, or to the John Spartan character of Demolition Man. An IGN article exploring the literary influences present in the Halo franchise commented on similarities between Halo and Orson Scott Card's Ender's Game: aspects of the SPARTAN Project and the design of the Covenant Drones are perceived as reminiscent of the super soldier program and Buggers found in the novel. Bungie has also acknowledged James Cameron's film Aliens as a strong cinematic influence.

A report written by Roger Travis and published by The Escapist compares Halo with the Latin epic Aeneid, written by classical Roman poet Virgil. Travis posits similarities between the plots of both works and compares the characters present in them, with the Flood and Covenant taking the role performed by the Carthaginians, and the Master Chief's role in the series to that of Aeneas.

Music

Martin O'Donnell and Michael Salvatori collaborated to produce the soundtracks for Bungie's Halo games. Approached by Bungie to produce something ancient and mysterious for Halos debut, O'Donnell decided to compose a theme using Gregorian chant, joining in with others to sing the vocal parts. Due to the varying nature of gameplay, the music was designed to use change dynamically based on the gameplay. To afford a more enjoyable listening experience, O'Donnell rearranged portions of the music of Halo into standalone suites, which follow the narrative course of the game, for the soundtrack releases. For Halo 2, the soundtrack included licensed music from Incubus and Breaking Benjamin alongside the orchestral score; rock guitar virtuoso, Steve Vai, performed various solos throughout the score.

The music of Halo helped spur a renewed interest in chant music.

For Halo 2s soundtrack, producer Nile Rodgers and O'Donnell decided to split the music into two separate volumes. The first, Volume One, was released on November 9, 2004, and contained all the themes as well as the "inspired-by" music present in the game (featuring Steve Vai, Incubus, Hoobastank, and Breaking Benjamin). The second release, Volume 2, contained the rest of the music, much of which was incomplete or not included in the first soundtrack, as the first soundtrack was shipped before the game was released. Halo 2, unlike its predecessor, was mixed to take full advantage of Dolby 5.1 Digital Surround Sound. In 2014, the in-game music was rerecorded and remastered for the Halo 2 Anniversary release which was part of the Master Chief Collection which included remastered versions of all Halo games with Master Chief as the protagonist.

The soundtrack for Halo 3 was released on November 20, 2007. O'Donnell noted he wanted to bring back the themes from the original game to help tie together the end of the trilogy. The tracks are presented, similarly to the previous soundtrack for Halo 2, in a suite form. Unlike previous soundtracks, where much of the music had been synthesized on computer, the soundtrack for Halo 3 was recorded using a 60-piece orchestra, along with a 24-voice chorus. The final soundtrack was recorded by the Northwest Sinfonia at Studio X in Seattle, Washington. The soundtracks were bundled and released as a box set in December 2008. A soundtrack for Halo 3: ODST was released alongside the game and included many of the tracks from the game.

For Bungie's last game in the Halo series, Halo: Reach, Martin O'Donnell and Michael Salvatori returned to compose the soundtrack. O'Donnell wrote "somber, more visceral" music to reflect the darker nature of the campaign and style of the game. As Bungie had been making Halo 3: ODST and Halo: Reach at the same time, Martin O'Donnell had also been composing the soundtracks at the same time, but production for the music of Halo: Reach did not begin until after the release of Halo 3: ODST. The soundtrack was released on iTunes on September 15, 2010, and in a two-disc set on September 28, 2010.

For Halo Wars, the task of creating the game's music fell to Stephen Rippy. Rippy listened to O'Donnell's soundtracks for inspiration and incorporated the Halo theme into parts of his arrangements. In addition to synthesized and orchestral components, the composer focused on the choir and piano as essential elements, feeling these were important in creating the "Halo sound". Rather than use the Northwest Sinfonia, Rippy traveled to Prague and recorded with the FILMharmonic Orchestra before returning to the United States to complete the music. A standalone compact disc and digital download retail version of the soundtrack was announced in January 2009 for release on February 17.

The music of Halo 4 was composed by Neil Davidge and Kazuma Jinnouchi. The Halo 4 Original Soundtrack was released on October 22, 2012, followed by a two-disc Special Edition on November 6. Neil Davidge served as an out-of-house composer for 343 Industries which proved to be very expensive leading Kazuma Jinnouchi to take over the responsibility of music production for Halo 5: Guardians. The music by Neil Davidge and Kazuma Jinnouchi for Halo 4 received mixed reviews, being recognized as creative music but too different from the original Halo formula.

In 2014, Kazuma Jinnouchi confirmed he would be composing the soundtrack for Halo 5: Guardians. On October 30, 2015, Halo 5: Guardians Original Soundtrack was released on CD and Vinyl. The soundtrack used a 30-person choir located in Prague, Czech Republic. The orchestral soundtrack was recorded at the Abbey Road Studio over the duration of 5 separate trips.

In 2017, 343 Industries and Creative Studios released a sequel to Halo Wars titled Halo Wars 2. The soundtrack was composed by Gordy Haab, Brian Lee White and Brian Trifo under the direction of Paul Lipson who had helped in the audio and music of nearly every previous Halo title. The Halo Wars 2 soundtrack featured many melodies from the music that Stephen Rippy had composed for the first Halo Wars but with new arrangements and more melodies to represent the individual characters. The original game soundtrack was released on February 17, 2017, and released digitally on February 21, 2017.

Adaptations

The Halo franchise includes various types of merchandise and adaptations outside of the video games. This includes bestselling novels, graphic novels, and other licensed products, from action figures to a packaging tie-in with Mountain Dew. Numerous action figures and vehicles based on Halo have been produced. Joyride Studios created Halo and Halo 2 action figures, while Halo 3 poseable and collectible action figures, aimed at collectors, were produced by McFarlane Toys and became some of the top-selling action figures of 2007 and 2008. MEGA Bloks partnered with Microsoft to produce Halo Wars-themed toys.

Books

As part of Microsoft's multimedia efforts, Microsoft Studios decided to create a tie-in novel for Combat Evolved. Eric Nylund wrote Halo: The Fall of Reach in seven weeks, and published in October 2001. The game itself was turned into a novelization by William C. Dietz in 2003, called Halo: The Flood. Nylund would write additional Halo works including the novels First Strike (2003) and Ghosts of Onyx (2006). Other novels have been written by Joseph Staten, Tobias S. Buckell, Karen Traviss, Greg Bear, Matt Forbeck, John Shirley, Troy Denning, Cassandra Rose Clarke, and Kelly Gay.

A collection of Halo short stories, Halo: Evolutions, was simultaneously released in print and audiobook formats in November 2009. Evolutions includes original material by Nylund, Buckell, Karen Traviss and contributions from Bungie. Tor re-released the first three Halo novels with new content and cover art. Another collection, Halo: Fractures, compiled new and previously released short fiction in 2016.

Comics
The Halo universe was first adapted into the graphic novel format in 2006, with the release of The Halo Graphic Novel, a collection of four short stories. It was written and illustrated by graphic novelists Lee Hammock, Jay Faerber, Tsutomu Nihei, Brett Lewis, Simon Bisley, Ed Lee and Jean Giraud. At the 2007 New York Comic Con, Marvel Comics announced they would be working on an ongoing Halo series with Brian Michael Bendis and Alex Maleev. The limited series, titled Halo: Uprising, bridges the gap between the events of Halo 2 and Halo 3; initially planned to conclude shortly before the release of Halo 3, the constant delays led to the final issue being published April 2009.

Marvel announced at the 2009 Comic Con that two new comics, a five-part series written by Peter David and a second series written by Fred Van Lente, would appear the coming summer and winter. David's series, Halo: Helljumper, is set prior to Halo: Combat Evolved and focuses on the elite Orbital Drop Shock Troopers. The five-part series was published between July and November 2009. Lente's series, originally titled Spartan Black, revolves around a black ops team of Spartan supersoldiers assigned to the UNSC Office of Naval Intelligence. The rebranded comic, Halo: Blood Line, debuted in December 2009. A comic-retelling of the novel Halo: The Fall of Reach was the most recent comic series entitled: Halo: Fall of Reach. Fall of Reach was split into three mini-stories: Boot Camp, Covenant, and Invasion. Two new series were announced in 2013. A three-part series, Halo: Initiation was released August 2013 with Brian Reed returning as writer. Also announced was Halo: Escalation, an ongoing comic series covering the period directly after Halo 4.

By August 2021, the Halo series consisted of thirteen different graphic novels and comic book series, written by various authors.

Live-action

Unproduced feature
In 2005, Columbia Pictures president Peter Schlessel began working outside the studio system to produce a Halo film adaptation. Alex Garland wrote a script, which was then pitched to studios by couriers dressed as Master Chief. Microsoft's terms required $10 million against 15 percent of gross; most studios passed, citing the lack of risk for Microsoft compared to their large share of potential profits. 20th Century Fox and Universal Pictures decided to partner to produce the film, paying Microsoft $5 million to option the film and 10 percent of grosses. Peter Jackson was slated to be the executive producer, with Neill Blomkamp as director. Before Blomkamp signed on, Guillermo del Toro was in negotiations to direct.

D. B. Weiss and Josh Olson rewrote Garland's script during 2006. Pre-production of the film was halted and restarted several times. Later that year, 20th Century Fox threatened to pull out of the project, leading Universal to issue an ultimatum to Jackson and Schlessel: either reduce their large "first-dollar" revenue deals, or the project was ended. Both refused, and the project stalled. Blomkamp declared the project dead in late 2007, though Jackson insisted the film would still be made. Blomkamp and Jackson collaborated on District 9, but the director told /Film that he was no longer considering working on a Halo film if the opportunity arose. The rights for the film have since reverted to Microsoft. Blomkamp would produce a series of live-action shorts as promotion for Halo 3, collectively titled Halo: Landfall.

Halo 4: Forward Unto Dawn

Halo 4: Forward Unto Dawn is a live-action film and miniseries set in the Halo universe. Although shot as a feature-length film, Forward Unto Dawn was originally released as a webseries consisting of five episodes released between October 5, 2012, and November 2, 2012. The series' plot, occurring in the early days of the Human-Covenant War circa 2526, revolves around Thomas Lasky, a young cadet at Corbulo Academy of Military Science, and how John-117 inspired him to eventually become a leader. Lasky is also a prominent character in Halo 4 as a commander on the UNSC Infinity. The name of the series, aside from being a reference to the UNSC frigate Forward Unto Dawn, is given new significance in the series as part a running motif based on a poem. The film cut was released on Blu-ray and DVD on December 4, 2012.

Halo: Nightfall
On April 3, 2014, it was announced that Ridley Scott and his production company, Scott Free Productions, were working on a Halo digital feature alongside 343 Industries and Xbox Entertainment Studios; Scott would be the executive producer, with David W. Zucker and Sergio Mimica-Gezzan as the directors. The feature was expected to follow the same format as Machinima's Halo 4: Forward Unto Dawn. On June 9, 2014, it was announced at E3 2014 that the feature, titled Halo: Nightfall, would be included with Halo: The Master Chief Collection at its November 2014 launch. The feature introduces a new character to the franchise, Agent Jameson Locke, played by actor Mike Colter; Nightfall is considered to be his origin story. Locke is one of the Spartans portrayed on the cover art and plays a large role in the series. On July 24, 2014, 343 Industries released the first trailer for the feature. Halo: Nightfall is available to watch through Halo Channel, an application for the Xbox One, Windows 8.1 and Windows Phone. On March 16, 2015, the series became available to stream, download, and buy on physical disc.

Paramount+ television series

On May 21, 2013, Xbox Entertainment Studios and 343 announced that a live-action television show of Halo would be produced with Steven Spielberg serving as executive producer through what is now Amblin Television. It was originally titled Halo: The Television Series. Neill Blomkamp was rumored to be directing the pilot for the series. Xbox Entertainment Studios shut down in 2014. Later, it was announced the series would premiere on the American premium cable network Showtime. It had been in development hell for many years. On March 1, 2018, it was announced that the series would start filming in late 2018, with speculation of the series airing in mid- to late-2019. On June 28, 2018, Kyle Killen was hired as showrunner and executive producer and Rupert Wyatt as director and executive producer. On December 4, 2018, Wyatt stepped down as director and executive producer from the project due to scheduling conflicts. On February 21, 2019, Otto Bathurst replaced Wyatt as director and executive producer. On April 17, 2019, it was announced that Pablo Schreiber was cast as Master Chief. On August 2, 2019, Deadline reported that Natascha McElhone had been cast in two key roles: Cortana and Dr. Catherine Halsey, Bokeem Woodbine was also cast as Soren-066, along with Shabana Azmi as Admiral Margaret Parangosky, and Yerin Ha as Kwan Ha. It was also announced that the series would be released in early 2021. Filming was incorrectly reported to have officially began in October 2019. In November 2020, Jen Taylor, who voiced Cortana in every major game in the Halo franchise, replaced McElhorne in that role. It then was reported that filming began in February 2021 and that ViacomCBS was shifting the show from Showtime to Paramount+ with Showtime retaining production credits. The series premiered on March 24, 2022.

Animated series

Microsoft announced at Comic-Con 2009 that it was overseeing production of a series of seven short anime films, together called Halo Legends. Financed by 343 Industries, the animation was created by six Japanese production houses: Bee Train Production, Bones, Casio Entertainment, Production I.G., Studio 4°C, and Toei Animation. Shinji Aramaki, creator and director of Appleseed and Appleseed Ex Machina, served as the project's creative director. Warner Bros. distributed Legends on DVD and Blu-ray in February 2010. Six of the stories are officially part of the Halo canon, with the seventh, made by Toei, intended to be a parody of the universe.

An animated version of The Fall of Reach was included in the Halo 5: Guardians Limited Edition and Collector's Edition.

Reception and critical response

The Halo franchise has been highly successful commercially and critically. During the two months following Halo: Combat Evolveds release, it sold alongside more than fifty percent of Xbox consoles. Halo 2s sales generated US$125 million on its premiere day, making it the fastest selling United States media product in history up to that time. Combined with Halos sales, the two games sold 14.8 million units before Halo 3s release. At the end of 2007, Halo 2 and Halo: Combat Evolved were the number one and two best-selling Xbox titles, respectively, and Halo 3 was the best-selling Xbox 360 title. The Halo series had sold more than 81 million copies by 2021.

Halos success led to the term "Halo killer" being used to describe console games that aspire, or are considered, to be better than Halo. It was the Xbox's killer app.

Total franchise sales amounted to more than $6 billion in 2021.

The soundtracks to Halo 2, Halo 3, ODST and Reach all appeared on the Billboard 200 charts for at least one week. By May 2011, total gross of Halo merchandise was $2 billion, with 40 million copies of the games sold. The total amount climbed to $2.3 billion in July 2011, and $2.8 billion in January 2012. Total franchise grosses exceeded $4.6 billion by October 2015, with 25% of the figure from non-game-related merchandise.

The Halo adaptations have been successful as well. Many of the novels have appeared on Publishers Weeklys bestseller charts and the Halo Graphic Novel sold more than 100,000 copies, a "rare hit" for the games-to-comics genre. Ghosts of Onyx, Contact Harvest, The Cole Protocol and the first volume of Cryptum appeared on The New York Times bestseller lists, and The Cole Protocol also opened 50th overall on USA Today bestsellers list. Tor's first three novels sold more than one million copies by April 2009.

Overall, the Halo series has been very well received by critics. Halo: Combat Evolved has received numerous Game of the Year awards. In March 2007, IGN listed it as the top Xbox game of all time, while readers ranked it the fourteenth best game ever on "IGN Readers' Choice 2006 – The Top 100 Games Ever". Conversely, Game Spy ranked Halo: Combat Evolved tenth on its list of "Top 25 Most Overrated Games of All Time", citing repetitive level design and the lack of an online multiplayer mode. Halo 2 also received numerous awards, with IGN listing it as the number two top Xbox game of all time in March 2007. From its initial release on the Xbox in November 2004 until the launch of Gears of War on the Xbox 360 in November 2006 – two years later – Halo 2 was the most popular video game on Xbox Live. Halo 3 was nominated for and won multiple awards; it won Time magazine's "Game of the Year" and IGN chose it as the Best Xbox 360 Online Multiplayer Game and Innovative Design of 2007. Most publications called the multiplayer aspect one of the best features; IGN said the multiplayer map lineup was the strongest of the series, and GameSpy added that the multiplayer offering will greatly please "Halo veterans". Complaints focused on the game's plot. The New York Times said the game had a "throwaway" plot and Total Video Games judged the single-player aspect ultimately disappointing. The series' music and audio has received enthusiastic response from game reviewers.

Cultural impact
The main trilogy, particularly its protagonist, are considered iconic and a symbol of today's video games; a wax replica of Master Chief was made by Madame Tussauds in Las Vegas, where Pete Wentz compared the character to notable characters from previous generations like Spider-Man, Frodo, and Luke Skywalker. GamesTM stated Halo: Combat Evolved "changed video game combat forever", and Halo 2 showcased Xbox Live as a tool for communities. Game Daily noted Halo 2s launch was "easily comparable to the biggest in other sectors of the entertainment industry", marking the first time a video game launch has become a major cultural event in the United States. Halo has been described as a series that "has reinvented a genre that didn't know it needed to be reinvented", with aspects of the main trilogy being duplicated in other first-person shooter games multiple times.

Variety called Halo "the equivalent of Star Wars". The fandom is referred to as the "Halo nation".

Machinima

The Halo franchise spurred an array of productions in an emerging genre of machinima—the use of games for filmmaking. Most productions are set outside Halo canon, while others are based on fan fiction closely relating to the story. Halo 3 includes a saved film function that allows camera angles not possible in previous games, and other features that simplify production. The game has become one of the most popular tools for generating machinima, and Microsoft updated its user license agreement to allow noncommercial distribution of such films.

A notable machinima production is the comedy series Red vs. Blue created by Rooster Teeth Productions. It has achieved an unparalleled level of success in Halo machinima in specific, and machinima in general; it is credited with bringing attention to the genre. Red vs. Blue generated annual revenues of US$200,000, and special promotional episodes were commissioned by Bungie. The first series, The Blood Gulch Chronicles, ended on June 28, 2007, after 100 regular episodes and numerous promotional videos. Subsequent series include The Recollection, which contains more dramatic elements than its comedic predecessor, Project Freelancer, The Chorus Trilogy, Anthology, and The Shisno Paradox. Other machinima series include Arby ‘n the Chief, Fire Team Charlie, The Codex, and the in-game interview show This Spartan Life.

Esports
Players began creating impromptu Halo tournaments and local parties after the release of the first game. Bungie looked at the success of these matches as inspiration for crafting the online multiplayer components of Halo 2.

Larger organizations soon began operating Halo competitive games. In August 2002, G4 hosted the Halo National Championship Finals, a FFA [free-for-all] tournament involving sixteen players from across the country (hosted by Wil Wheaton of Star Trek fame.) The Associates of Gaming Professionals (AGP), which focused solely on Halo, held its first event in November 2002. Inspired by friends placing bets on their Halo matches, Mike Sepso and Sundance DiGiovanni formed Major League Gaming the same year.

Microsoft and 343 Industries sponsored their own professional Halo league, called the Halo Championship Series (HCS), in 2014. It was started in partnership with the Electronic Sports League (ESL). Seasons 1 and 2 ran on The Master Chief Collection. In August 2015 Microsoft announced it would be increasing the total prize pool of the HCS to $1 million USD, for the newly announced Halo World Championship, which will be the debut event for Halo 5. This prize pool was later announced to be crowd-funded, which later resulted in Major League Gaming announcing that the prize pool had climbed to $2 million USD. Later that week, 343 announced that the prize pool was locked at $2.5 million USD. This was the largest console esports prize pool ever.

References

External links

 
 Halo  at Bungie
 Halopedia – an external wiki

 
Video games about ancient astronauts
Esports games
Science fiction shooter video games
Microsoft franchises
Military science fiction
Video game franchises introduced in 2001
Video games adapted into novels
Video games adapted into comics
Video games adapted into films
Video games adapted into television shows
Fiction about megastructures
Space opera video games
Space opera
Alien invasions in fiction
Fiction set in the 26th century
Genocide in fiction